Melitta Schenk Gräfin von Stauffenberg (née Schiller; 3 January 1903 – 8 April 1945) was an aviator who served as a test pilot in the Luftwaffe before and during World War II.

She was the second German woman to be awarded the honorary title of Flugkapitän and also flew over 2,500 test flights in dive bombers, the second most of any Luftwaffe test pilot. Von Stauffenberg was awarded the Iron Cross Second Class and the Gold Front Flying Clasp for Bombers with diamonds, for performing over 1,500 test flights in dive bomber aircraft. In 1944, she was arrested with other Stauffenberg family members on suspicion of conspiring with her brothers-in-law to assassinate Adolf Hitler, but she was later released to continue her test flight duties.

Countess von Stauffenberg died after being shot down by an American fighter plane on 8 April 1945.

Biography
Melitta was born in Krotoschin, Prussia. Her father was Michael Schiller. Her mother was Margaret Eberstein. She had four siblings: Marie-Luise, Otto, Jutta and Klara.  

With the end of World War I Krotoschin became part of Poland. In October 1919 Melitta began attending boarding school across the border in Hirschberg, Silesia.

Melitta passed the diploma for university entrance in 1922 and accepted a place at the Technical University of Munich. There she studied mathematics, physics and engineering, eventually specialising in aeronautical engineering. In 1927 she graduated cum laude.

Aviation experience
Melitta started working for the Deutsche Versuchsanstalt für Luftfahrt (DVL), an experimental institute for aviation, in Berlin-Adlershof in 1927. In July 1929 she began flying lessons at Staaken and obtained her provisional flying license with a few months and her full license by mid-1930.  

In 1936 she was forced from her job as Ingenieurflugzeugführerin (aeronautical engineer) because of her paternal grandfather's Jewish origins, despite her father having converted to Christianity at the age of 18.

On 11 August 1937 at Berlin-Wilmersdorf, Melitta married the historian Alexander Schenk Graf von Stauffenberg, and on 28 October 1937, she was given the honorary rank of Flugkapitänin, or "flight captain", a rank reserved for test pilots in Germany at the time, and became only the second woman in Germany, after Hanna Reitsch, to achieve this. She eventually gained licences for all classes of powered aircraft, the aerobatic flying licence, and the glider licence.

World War II
At the beginning of World War II, Melitta wanted to work for the Red Cross but was ordered to become a test pilot for the Luftwaffe at the central Erprobungsstelle test facility in Rechlin, Mecklenburg. Still a civilian, she was officially seconded from Askania. She did test dives in warplanes, up to 15 times a day, from a height of 4,000 metres.

From 1942, Melitta continued her test-flights at the Luftwaffe's technical academy in Berlin-Gatow. She was awarded the Iron Cross 2nd Class on 22 January 1943; the medal was pinned on her by Oberkommando der Luftwaffe Hermann Göring on 29th. She made her dissertation for her Masters qualification in 1944, and received an A grade. She then became technical chief of the Versuchsstelle für Flugsondergeräte, another test institute, in the same year.

When the 20 July plot failed, she was arrested with the rest of the Stauffenberg family. Her two brothers-in-law, Claus and Berthold, were executed. She and her husband, as well as the other adult members of the family, were sent to concentration camps. However, she was released on 2 September, because of the military importance of her work. As the name von Stauffenberg was anything but popular among the Nazis, she was now officially addressed as "Gräfin Schenk" instead of "Gräfin Schenk von Stauffenberg". Her sisters-in-law, one of them pregnant, were confined in concentration camps and the Stauffenberg children were taken away from their mothers. Melitta used her prominent position to help as much as she could.

Melitta felt loyal to Germany, but not to the Nazis. She therefore supported the Luftwaffe, but she confessed in her diaries that this moral conflict tormented her. 

Melitta maintained contact with the incarcerated members of her extended family, even though they were imprisoned in concentration camps. Her status, and the possibility that the prisoners might be useful in a bargain with the Western Allies when Germany finally fell, kept them moderately well looked after. She flew several times to Buchenwald concentration camp once she learned in March 1945 that her husband was there. As research facilities in Berlin were dispersed to other locations ahead of the Soviet advance, Melitta's activities were moved to Wurzberg, where she found that a RAF raid had destroyed her house.

Death
On 4 April, with her assistant pilot Hubertus, she set out for Buchenwald. Seeing from the air that the special prisoner compound was empty – the prisoners had been moved to Regensburg – she flew back to Weimar. They flew some personnel from Weimar in an overloaded Siebel Si 204 onto Pilsen where they exchanged the Siebel for a two-seater Bü 181 Bestmann trainer on 6 April. At Marienburg Hubertus left her to fly on to Straubing and then Regensburg to look for her husband. By that point her husband and other prisoners had been moved again; Melitta got a Gestapo authorisation to visit the commandant at Schönberg where they had been taken.

She took off early on 8 April 1945, flying low to the ground along the line of the railway to navigate. An American fighter looking for trains to attack along the line attacked near Straßkirchen, Bavaria. She crash-landed the aircraft and was conscious when civilians arrived to help. She asked for assistance to get out of the aircraft, and was extracted from the aircraft alive. The civilians reported her most serious injury appeared to be a broken leg. 

A local doctor, Hans Siegl from Straßkirchen, arrived at the scene but as a Luftwaffe doctor and other military were on scene his services were not needed; she was taken off in an ambulance. Von Stauffenberg's injuries did not appear life-threatening, but she died two hours later. Her remains were taken to the hospital in Straubing, where the town mortuary book noted as the cause of death "...skull base fracture, tearing of the left thigh, fracture of the right ankle."  Her husband learned of her death a few days later. She was buried on 13 April in St Michaels Cemetery, arranged by Staubing airbase commander's assistant.

In September 1945 Alexander arranged to have her exhumed and transported to the Stauffenberg estate at Lautlingen where she was interred in the family crypt on 8 September 1945.

Awards
Iron Cross Second Class
Gold Front Flying Clasp for Bombers with Diamonds

References

Bibliography 
 
 
 Ernst Probst/Heiko Peter Melle: Sturzflüge für Deutschland: Kurzbiografie der Testpilotin Melitta Schenk Gräfin von Stauffenberg. Grin-Verlag, München 2012,

External links 
 Rudolf Nadolny at www.drk.de
 Melitta Schiller (1903 - 1945), Pioneer Aviatrix at www.ctie.monash.edu.au
 

1903 births
1945 deaths
People from Krotoszyn
People from the Province of Posen
German test pilots
Glider pilots
German countesses
German women aviators
German military personnel killed in World War II
German people of Jewish descent
Women in World War II
Recipients of the Iron Cross (1939), 2nd class
Melitta
Aviators killed in aviation accidents or incidents in Germany
Aviators killed by being shot down
Victims of aviation accidents or incidents in 1945
Technical University of Munich alumni
German World War II pilots